Seyam is a surname.

Notable people with the surname include:
Reda Seyam (born 1959 or 1960), German-Egyptian Islamic militant and official in the Islamic State
Said Seyam (1959 – 2009), interior minister of the Palestinian government of March 2006
Tamer Seyam (born 1992), Palestinian international footballer